Nan Zhang (born November 1, 1986) is an American actress and model. She co-starred as Kati Farkas in The CW teen drama, Gossip Girl, until the show ended in 2012.

Early life and education
Born in Bengbu in the province of Anhui, China, Zhang and her family moved to the United States when she was six years old and settled in Slidell, Louisiana. She is an only child. After being selected in Chanel/Seventeen Magazine's New Model of the Year contest at the age of 16, Zhang decided to pursue modeling.

Career
Her acting debut came about when Zhang was discovered by a casting director while she was at a nail salon in New York which landed her a bit part in The Shanghai Hotel and followed with an uncredited bit part in West 32nd. Zhang's short lived break into showbiz came in March 2007 when she was cast in the supporting role of Kati Farkas in the television adaptation of the popular young adult novels, Gossip Girl.

Before acting, Zhang started her career as a model in New York City.

Zhang participated in the period drama series “Legacy” which will premiere exclusively on WarnerMedia’s regional streaming service HBO Go at an unspecified date later in 2021. “Legacy” is a 1920s-set drama that chronicles the lives of the wealthy Yi family and three sisters who vie to inherit their father’s shopping mall business. In a time of upheaval and uncertainty, the three sisters set aside their differences to keep the business afloat and save their family.

Personal life
Zhang had previously wanted to be actively involved with neuroscience research and returned to Johns Hopkins University to pursue her pre-med/neuroscience degree. She graduated in 2012, while filming simultaneously. She then went on to attain her graduate degree from Johns Hopkins University.

References

External links

Nan Zhang's biography at the official CW Gossip Girl website

1983 births
Living people
Actresses from Anhui
Actresses from New York City
American film actresses
Female models from Louisiana
Chinese emigrants to the United States
Johns Hopkins University alumni
Actresses from New Orleans
American actresses of Chinese descent
American models of Chinese descent
American television actresses
American child models
People from Slidell, Louisiana
People from Bengbu
21st-century American actresses